The 1973 Bath City Council election was held on Thursday 10 May 1973 to elect councillors to the new Bath City Council in England. It took place on the same day as other district council elections in the United Kingdom.

These were the first elections to the new district council, which would come into effect on 1 April 1974. Future elections would take place every three years, with the next election scheduled for 6 May 1976.

The 1973 election saw no party take overall control of the council, with the Conservatives being the largest party.

Election results

Ward results

Abbey

Bathwick

Bloomfield

Combe Down

Kingsmead

Lambridge

Lansdown

Lyncombe

Newbridge

Oldfield

Twerton East

Twerton West

Walcot

Westmoreland

Widcombe

References

Bath
1973